21st Regiment may refer to:

Infantry regiments
 21 Regiment Special Air Service, a unit of the British Army
 21st Foot, a former regiment of the British Army
 21st Infantry Regiment (Thailand), a unit of the Royal Thai Army
 21st Infantry Regiment (United States), a unit of the United States Army
 21st Punjabis, a unit of the British Indian Army
 21st Marine Infantry Regiment, a unit of the French Marines
 21st Marine Regiment (United States), a unit of the United States Marine Corps

American Revolutionary War regiments 

 21st Continental Regiment

American Civil War regiments 

 21st Iowa Volunteer Infantry Regiment
 21st Illinois Volunteer Infantry Regiment
 21st Maine Volunteer Infantry Regiment
 21st Michigan Volunteer Infantry Regiment
 21st Mississippi Infantry Regiment
 21st Ohio Infantry
 21st Kansas Militia Infantry Regiment
 21st Regiment Kentucky Volunteer Infantry
 21st Regiment Massachusetts Volunteer Infantry
 21st Wisconsin Volunteer Infantry Regiment

Cavalry regiments 
 21st Lancers, a unit of the British Army

Engineer regiments 

 21st Construction Regiment (Australia), a former unit of the Australian Army's Engineers
 21 Engineer Regiment (United Kingdom), a unit of the British Army's Royal Engineers

See also

 XXI Corps (disambiguation)
 21st Brigade (disambiguation)
 21st Division (disambiguation)
 21 Squadron (disambiguation)
 Regiment